Georgy (Gosha) Ostretsov is a Russian artist and performer. Ostretsov represented Russia during the 53rd Venice Biennale in 2009.

Biography 
Born in Moscow in 1967, Ostretsov went to Paris, France, in 1988, where he worked in fashion industry and advertising.  and married Liudmila Konstantinova, a Moscow artist, in 2007, with whom they have four children. In 2010, he created an association of contemporary artists called VGLAZ, working with Artika project Company to design public studios to help artists.

Selected solo exhibitions 
2016  I’ve Been Abducted Hundred Times. Triangle Gallery. Moscow
2009  Personal project during the 53rd Venice Biennale.

Selected group exhibitions 
2015  Pink box, Erarta Museum. St-Petersbourg
2014  Contemporary paint. State Russian Museum. St-Petersbourg
2014 Reconstruction-2. Cultural found "Ekaterina". Moscow
2012 Gaiety Is The Most Outstanding Feature of the Soviet Union, Saatchi Gallery. London
2010 Russian landscape. Marat Gelman gallery. Moscow.
2009 VROOM! La Maison Rouge. Paris.
2008 Sots Art / Political Art in Russia from 1972 to today. La Maison Rouge. Paris.
2007 2nd Moscow Biennial Exhibition of Modern Art, "Sots-Art", Tretyakov Gallery, Moscow.
2005 Participation in a group exhibition within the 1st Moscow Biennial Exhibition of Modern Art, "Soobshchniki" (Partners), Tretyakov Gallery, Moscow.
2005 "George&George" exhibition "In process", paintings, video. State Center of Modern Art, Moscow.

References

External links 
 Saatchi gallery
 Artika Project

1968 births
Living people
Russian contemporary artists